The Construction and Principal Uses of Mathematical Instruments is a book by Nicholas Bion, first published in 1709. It was translated into English in 1723 by Edmund Stone.

It was described as "the most famous book devoted to instruments" by historian of science David M. Knight.

Nicholas Bion

Nicholas Bion (1652–1733) was a French instrument maker and author with workshops in Paris. He was king's engineer for mathematical instruments. He died in Paris in 1733 aged 81.

Bibliography
Bion is author of the following:
L'usage des Globes Célestes et Terrestres et des sphères suivant les differents systèmes du Monde (Amsterdam, 1700)
Usage des Astrolabes
 Traité de la construction et des principaux usages des instrumens de mathématique (Paris, 1709) (online version)

References

Further reading

External links
Online edition
Bell Book Collection at the Microsoft Cybermuseum
Portrait of Nicholas Bion

1709 books
1709 in science
French non-fiction books
Engineering books
Mathematics books
18th-century French literature